Glenfield (called Mayfield until 1912) is a suburb, part of the contiguous Auckland metropolitan area. It is located in the North Shore, north of the Waitemata Harbour, and Auckland is located in New Zealand.

Demographics

Glenfield had a population of 13,539 at the 2018 New Zealand census, an increase of 1,176 people (9.5%) since the 2013 census, and an increase of 2,061 people (18.0%) since the 2006 census. There were 4,257 households, comprising 6,708 males and 6,828 females, giving a sex ratio of 0.98 males per female, with 2,310 people (17.1%) aged under 15 years, 3,381 (25.0%) aged 15 to 29, 6,336 (46.8%) aged 30 to 64, and 1,515 (11.2%) aged 65 or older.

Ethnicities were 44.5% European/Pākehā, 7.0% Māori, 4.8% Pacific peoples, 47.6% Asian, and 4.8% other ethnicities. People may identify with more than one ethnicity.

The percentage of people born overseas was 54.2, compared with 27.1% nationally.

Although some people chose not to answer the census's question about religious affiliation, 43.1% had no religion, 39.8% were Christian, 0.3% had Māori religious beliefs, 4.7% were Hindu, 2.3% were Muslim, 2.9% were Buddhist and 2.3% had other religions.

Of those at least 15 years old, 3,618 (32.2%) people had a bachelor's or higher degree, and 1,251 (11.1%) people had no formal qualifications. 1,650 people (14.7%) earned over $70,000 compared to 17.2% nationally. The employment status of those at least 15 was that 6,012 (53.5%) people were employed full-time, 1,569 (14.0%) were part-time, and 426 (3.8%) were unemployed.

Geography

It is located to the north of the Waitematā Harbour, nine kilometres northwest of the Auckland city centre. The suburb is located in the northern inland part of the North Shore, and is surrounded by the suburbs of Marlborough, Sunnynook, Forrest Hill, Birkenhead, Northcote, Windy Ridge, and is situated close to Takapuna. The northern part of Glenfield is regarded as a separate suburb known as Glenfield North. This latter suburb is sited close to State Highway 1 as it stretches north towards Albany.

Glenfield has two main areas of commerce. One is the  Glenfield Mall and the surrounding shops. The other is Wairau Valley, which is a former industrial area that is now a mixture of commercial and industrial properties.

History
The district's first official name was Freemans after John Freeman, who established a post office bureau in his home on the corner of Glenfield and Kaipatiki Roads in 1888. It was commonly referred to as Mayfield because the white blossom of the manuka and kanuka trees reminded settlers of May springtime ‘back home’ in England. The existence of Mayfield in Canterbury meant that the name was never officially bestowed upon the area by the postal service. On 12 March 1912, the area was renamed Glenfield by the postal service. The name Mayfield lives on in Mayfield Road, a quiet side road several hundred metres north of the Glenfield shops.

Prior to the opening of the Auckland Harbour Bridge in 1959, Glenfield primarily consisted of farmland. During the 1960s, as access to the area improved, many of the large farm properties were subdivided to provide space for residential development.

On 9 December 1971, in response to fears about commercial sprawl down the length of Glenfield Rd, Glenfield Mall opened. It was among the earliest enclosed malls in the country. It featured a large aviary in the centre of the mall. In 2000, Glenfield Mall was completely redeveloped as Westfield Glenfield, but in 2015 reverted to its original name.

From 1 November 2010, Glenfield became part of the Kaipatiki Local Board area in the new Auckland Council.

Amenities
Southern Cross Hospital North Harbour, a privately owned hospital, is in Wairau Road.

Education
Glenfield College, founded in 1969, is a secondary (years 9–13) school with a roll of  students. Glenfield Intermediate, founded in 1972, is an intermediate (years 7–8) school with  students. All three schools are coeducational. Rolls are as of 

The South Seas Film, Television, and Animation school is in Glenfield.

Sport
Glenfield is home to Glenfield RFC, who are a member of the North Harbour Rugby Union, and Glenfield Rovers, who compete in the Lotto Sport Italia NRFL Division 1B. The Glenfield Greyhounds rugby league club are based in nearby Sunnynook Glenfield is also home to the Glenfield gators (top basketball team of glenfield intermediate circa 2021)

Notable people
Rachel Hunter – model

References

External links
 Glenfield College website
 Glenfield Intermediate website
 Glenfield Primary School website
 Photographs of Glenfield held in Auckland Libraries' heritage collections.

Suburbs of Auckland
North Shore, New Zealand
Kaipātiki Local Board Area